Leonardo Pietra Caprina (born 25 September 1997) is an Italian rower who won a bronze medal at the 2017 World Rowing Championships and 2022 European Rowing Championships in the eight.

References

External links
 

1997 births
Living people
Italian male rowers
21st-century Italian people
20th-century Italian people
Sportspeople from Milan
World Rowing Championships medalists for Italy